The Philadelphia Convention Hall and Civic Center, commonly known simply as the Philadelphia Civic Center, was a convention center complex located in Philadelphia, Pennsylvania. It developed out of a series of buildings dedicated to expanding trade which began with the National Export Exhibition in 1899. The two most significant buildings in the complex were the original main exhibition hall built in 1899, which later housed the Philadelphia Commercial Museum, and the Municipal Auditorium, later called the Convention Hall, which was built in 1931 to the designers of architect Philip H. Johnson. The site was host to national political conventions in 1900, 1936, 1940 and 1948.

Location
The Convention Hall arena was located at 3400 Civic Center Boulevard, on the edge of the campus of the University of Pennsylvania, and just to the southwest of Franklin Field. It was built in 1930 and its highest capacity was approximately 12,000. The building was an Art Deco landmark, notable for its many friezes and other decorative aspects.

Arena history

1930–1966
Originally known as the Municipal Auditorium, the arena hosted many events, including the 1936 and 1948 Democratic National Conventions, and the 1940 and 1948 Republican National Conventions. Thus the building became known as Convention Hall. Martin Luther King Jr. spoke there, and The Beatles, The Grateful Dead and the Philadelphia Mummers each performed there. The Philadelphia Warriors and Philadelphia 76ers both played many of their games in the arena; the 1960 NBA All-Star Game was played there.

President Lyndon B. Johnson spoke at a campaign appearance on August 29, 1964, at Convention Hall. He appeared at the Hall alongside many notable Philadelphia and Pennsylvania Democratic leaders. Four days later, The Beatles played the venue on September 2, 1964, during their first tour of the United States. Tickets went on sale in May 1964 and sold out within 90 minutes. The Rolling Stones played Convention Hall on May 1, 1965, during their third American tour.

1967–2005
After the opening of the Spectrum in South Philadelphia in 1967, the building nearly became obsolete. On February 5, 1970, The Jackson 5 played their first official concert for Motown Records there. The building was later used for Atlantic 10 Conference and Big Five basketball games. Jim Crockett Promotions, under the NWA banner, and later the Ted Turner-owned WCW, also staged professional wrestling there, which included three pay-per-view events: Halloween Havoc in 1989 and 1992 and the 1994 Slamboree event. The Civic Center also hosted the World Hockey Association's Philadelphia Blazers and the minor-league Philadelphia Firebirds hockey teams. The University of Pennsylvania used the building for commencements (due to it being larger than Penn's own basketball arena, the nearby Palestra), as did Drexel University, Temple University, St. Joseph's University, and La Salle University. Pope John Paul II and Nelson Mandela both spoke there.

Convention Hall was torn down in 2005, after more than a decade without a regular tenant. The 1996 Atlantic 10 Men's basketball tournament was the last event ever held there (its convention functions were taken over by the Pennsylvania Convention Center in the city's central business district); prior to this, it also hosted college basketball in the form of the 1986 MEAC men's basketball tournament. Afterwards, it served as a soundstage for movies and the TV series Hack starring David Morse. The championship fight scenes in the 1990 movie Rocky V was shot there.

The Auditorium's M.P. Moller 86-rank pipe organ, built in 1931, was removed just prior to the building's demolition and placed in Pennsylvania Hall in temporary storage. In October 2006 the organ was donated to the University of Oklahoma's American Organ Institute where it will be restored and become the centerpiece of their music programs.

The last remnant of the Civic Center, Pennsylvania Hall (built in 1978), was imploded on March 4, 2007. The University of Pennsylvania Health System's Perelman Center for Advanced Medicine opened on the site in October 2008.

It was purchased by the Alessi Organization in 2005 and in 2017 was installed outside its new Crossing Shopping Center at East 22nd Street and Route 440 in Bayonne, New Jersey.

References

Further reading

External links
Dedication booklet 
Information on Moller Opus 5819 now at the University of Oklahoma's School of Music, American Organ Institute 
Photos of the Civic Center prior to destruction including details of the preservation efforts
Philadelphia Player Article
Philadelphia Boxing History at Convention Hall

Basketball venues in Pennsylvania
Boxing venues in Philadelphia
Convention centers in Pennsylvania
Defunct basketball venues in the United States
Defunct college basketball venues in the United States
Former National Basketball Association venues
Defunct sports venues in Philadelphia
Demolished sports venues in Pennsylvania
Indoor ice hockey venues in the United States
La Salle Explorers men's basketball
Philadelphia 76ers venues
Philadelphia Firebirds (ice hockey)
Philadelphia Warriors venues
Temple Owls basketball venues
University City, Philadelphia
World Hockey Association venues
1931 establishments in Pennsylvania
Sports venues completed in 1931
2005 disestablishments in Pennsylvania
Sports venues demolished in 2005
Defunct indoor arenas in Pennsylvania